"Sojourn" is the eighth episode of the eighth season of the anthology television series American Horror Story. It aired on October 31, 2018, on the cable network FX. The episode was written by Josh Green, and directed by Bradley Buecker.

Plot
Michael Langdon realizes Ariel Augustus, Baldwin Pennypacker, and Miriam Mead have been executed. He is then confronted by Cordelia Goode, who tells him that she has prevented Michael from resurrecting Mead, but also insists that Michael still has capacity for good. Michael dismisses her, threatening to kill every witch. Wandering into a forest, the distressed Michael draws a pentagram on the ground with a rock. Pleading to his Father for guidance, he threatens to remain in the forest until he has received a message. Four days pass; a weak and starving Michael sees visions of a cherubic little girl offering him an apple and a beautiful young man with angel's wings, who tells him that God loves him. It is ambiguous as to whether these are angelic messengers or hallucinations. Eventually Michael is confronted by a black goat. Asking if the animal is his father, Michael stabs the goat to death, and a snake emerges from its severed head.

Weakened, Michael stumbles across a Satanic church. The High Priestess, Hannah, berates her fellow worshippers for their relatively unimpressive feats of sin, believing that the world must become significantly wicked in order to encourage the arrival of the Antichrist. A member of the congregation, Madelyn, takes pity on Michael, observing that he is undernourished and lost. After Church she takes him home with her to recover.

At Madelyn's home, Madelyn claims to have everything she wants because she sold her soul to Satan. Michael mocks her for her views and she attempts to kill him until he presents the mark of the beast on the back of his neck, proving himself as the Antichrist. Back at the church, Hannah presents two people for sacrifice when Madelyn interrupts and presents Michael, who confirms his identity and is hailed by the congregation. Michael proceeds to kill the two people offered up for sacrifice.

The congregation hosts a dinner for Michael, who admits that he has no plan for bringing about the apocalypse. Madelyn offers her services to him, but Michael tells her he only desires Mead's resurrection. Madelyn takes Michael to a robotics company run by two cocaine-addicted Satanists, Jeff and Mutt. Wilhemina Venable is revealed to be Jeff and Mutt's PA. Michael is mocked by Jeff and Mutt for being unintimidating, until he uses his powers to immolate a prostitute. Jeff and Mutt pledge themselves to Michael, who presents them with the task of recreating Mead. Mead's android replica is presented to Michael; she wakes and immediately recognizes Michael.

Reception
"Sojourn" was watched by 1.63 million people during its original broadcast, and gained a 0.7 ratings share among adults aged 18–49.

The episode received mixed reviews. On the review aggregator Rotten Tomatoes, "Sojourn" holds a 50% approval rating, based on 16 reviews with an average rating of 8/10. The critical consensus reads, "'Sojourn' saves itself from being a completely confusing bridge episode, thanks to a refocus on the existential sadness of Satan's spawn and a killer monologue from Sandra Bernhardt."

Ron Hogan of Den of Geek gave the episode a 3/5, saying, "Michael's trip back into the arms of the Church of Satan is one of the funniest things I've seen on American Horror Story. In true Satanic fashion, the gathering of Satan's flock of goats is essentially a mockery of a standard church service, with an offering plate being passed around and a sermon being delivered by the high Priestess (a really funny Sandra Bernhard)." He added, "Bradley Buecker does a good job at getting a sense of weariness out of the actors in the services. [...] no one seems to be having a very good time with what they're doing until they get a chance to show off for someone else. Otherwise, they're clearly bored, and trying to keep just busy enough to keep from getting yelled at."

Kat Rosenfield from Entertainment Weekly gave the episode a B+. She mentioned that some scenes were too confusing, especially the one where Michael experiences hallucinations and the one where the satanists are trying to please him with food. However, she appreciated that the episode gave finally some explanations about the post-apocalypse events of the season's first three episodes. She particularly enjoyed the appearance of Ms. Venable and the "true origin story of Robot Mead". Overall, she commented that it was "an extra-kooky, campy episode of AHS: Apocalypse", and that she was a big fan of Sandra Bernhard's appearance and performance.

Vultures Ziwe Fumudoh gave the episode a 4 out of 5. Much like Rosenfield, she did not understand the scene where Michael experiences hallucinations, calling it a "weird acid trip". She was also confused by Michael's attitude during the episode, but admitted that "I understand that sometimes depression makes people not act like themselves, even when that "self" is Satan's spawn". However, she was extremely pleased by the return of Ms. Venable, saying that "The best part of American Horror Story is seeing Sarah Paulson in 19 different wigs this season." She also enjoyed the final scene as it was "setting the scene for the plot of Apocalypse to come full circle."

References

External links

 

American Horror Story: Apocalypse episodes